Walang Hanggan may refer to:
Walang Hanggan (2003 TV series), a Philippine telenovela aired on GMA Network, starring Valerie Concepcion and Oyo Boy Sotto
Walang Hanggan (2012 TV series), a Philippine telenovela aired on ABS-CBN, starring Coco Martin and Julia Montes